Mons Bradley is a lunar mountain massif in the Montes Apenninus range, along the eastern edge of the Mare Imbrium. It is located to the west of the crater Conon. To the west of this peak is the Rima Bradley rille. (See below.)

It has a maximum diameter of 30 km across the base, and rises to a height of about 4.2 km. It is named after the English astronomer James Bradley (1692–1762).

Rima Bradley
This is a graben-type rille located in the southeastern part of the Mare Imbrium, near the Montes Apenninus range. To the northwest is the prominent crater Archimedes. This rille follows a course to the southwest, starting at the Palus Putredinis, and cutting through a hummocky region. To the east of the northern end of this rille is Rima Hadley and the landing site of the Apollo 15 mission.

This feature is centered at selenographic coordinates , and it has a maximum diameter of 161 km. The rille was named for the nearby Mons Bradley. Several tiny craters near this rille have been assigned names by the IAU. These are listed in the table below.

See also
 List of mountains on the Moon by height

References

External links

Mons Bradley at The Moon Wiki
Rima Bradley at The Moon Wiki

Bradley, Mons